Callograptus is a genus of graptolites.

References 

 Two species of the genus Callograptus Hall, 1865 (Graptolithina, Dendroidea) from the Lower Ordovician of Bohemia. Kraft J, Bulletin of Geosciences, volume 74, issue 1, pages 21–26

External links 

 
 
 Callograptus elegans at biolib.cz

Graptolite genera
Dendroidea
Paleozoic life of the Northwest Territories